C. angolensis may refer to:
 Carrissoa angolensis, a plant species
 Commiphora angolensis, a shrub species

See also 
 Angolensis